Ameivula is a genus of lizard that belongs to the family Teiidae. Many species were previously listed in the genus Cnemidophorus.

Classification
Listed alphabetically.
Ameivula abalosi 
Ameivula apipensis 
Ameivula cipoensis 
Ameivula confusioniba 
Ameivula jalapensis  
Ameivula mumbuca  
Ameivula nativo  
Ameivula nigrigula  
Ameivula ocellifera   - Spix's whiptail
Ameivula pyrrhogularis  
Ameivula xacriaba

References

 
Lizard genera
Taxa named by Michael B. Harvey
Taxa named by Gabriel N. Ugueto
Taxa named by Ronald L. Gutberlet Jr.